David Estrada (born March 28, 1968) is a Silicon Valley lawyer and Chief Legal & Policy Officer at Nuro Inc., a Mountain View, California-based robotics and self-driving car startup.

In the early days of the rideshare industry at Lyft in 2014, he built the government relations team and helped develop state laws for the industry during its battles with taxi interests. At Google X he shaped the first state-level autonomous vehicle regulations in Nevada, Florida, and California, and he spoke about the benefits of self-driving cars at a Computer History Museum event called Reinventing Law in 2013. When he joined Nuro in 2019 he was cited for asserting that autonomous vehicles used for goods delivery, like Nuro's, do not need steering wheels or seat belts.

Estrada worked with Sebastian Thrun to build the Kitty Hawk Corporation, a flying car company which launched a one-person VTOL aircraft called the Flyer. He sits on the board of directors of Wisk, a joint venture of Kitty Hawk and Boeing. At the first e-scooter sharing company, Bird Rides Inc., Estrada helped to establish the business in Los Angeles, throughout the US, and globally.

Estrada was the second attorney at the online video startup YouTube, joining in 2006 before it was acquired by Google, and he worked with Apple to make YouTube the only non-Apple application included on the original launch of the iPhone.

He is married to Gina Estrada and the couple have three children.

Estrada is a 1993 graduate of the UC Berkeley School of Law, where we was an articles editor for the Berkeley Technology Law Journal, a judicial extern for Judge Charles A. Legge of the Northern District of California, and taught a class called Street Law to empower high school students with legal tools.

References

California lawyers
21st-century American businesspeople
People from Mountain View, California
Living people
1968 births